Walking in the Air is an album by Chloë Agnew first released in 2004 under the Celtic Collections label.

In contrast with those from Agnew's fellow Celtic Woman members Órla Fallon, Lisa Kelly, Máiréad Nesbitt, and Méav Ní Mhaolchatha, the album was re-released in the United States in 2006 under the Manhattan Records-licensed "Celtic Woman Presents" label.

Track listing

References

External links 
 Celtic Collections Ltd.

2004 albums